Clupeoides is a genus of sprats that occur in rivers in Southeast Asia.  There are currently four recognized species in the genus.

Species
 Clupeoides borneensis Bleeker, 1851 (Borneo river sprat)
 Clupeoides hypselosoma Bleeker, 1866 (Kalimantan river sprat)
 Clupeoides papuensis (E. P. Ramsay & J. D. Ogilby, 1886) (Papuan river sprat)
 Clupeoides venulosus M. C. W. Weber & de Beaufort, 1912 (West Irian river sprat)

References
 

 
Clupeidae
Taxa named by Pieter Bleeker
Freshwater fish genera
Taxonomy articles created by Polbot